Chris Patrick (born August 22, 1984) is a former American football offensive tackle. He was signed by the New York Giants as an undrafted free agent in 2007. He played college football at the University of Nebraska.

Patrick was also a member of the New England Patriots, Green Bay Packers, Detroit Lions, Philadelphia Eagles, Kansas City Chiefs, San Francisco 49ers, Edmonton Eskimos, Toronto Argonauts, Virginia Destroyers, and Saskatchewan Roughriders.

Professional career
Patrick was originally entered in the NFL Supplemental Draft after forgoing his senior year at Nebraska and missing the deadline for the traditional NFL Draft. 

He was added to the Eagles' 53-man roster for the final seven (4 regular season and 3 playoff) games of the 2008 NFL season, but saw no game action. After starting the 2009 NFL season with the Chiefs as a member of that team's practice squad, Patrick signed with the 49ers in late October to add depth to the offensive line. He made his first NFL regular-season appearance on November 22 against the Green Bay Packers at Lambeau Field. Patrick appeared in two more games in the 2009 season, December 14 against the Arizona Cardinals - his Candlestick Park debut - and January 3 at the St. Louis Rams. All three appearances came on special teams.

Patrick was waived by the 49ers on August 18, 2010.

Patrick signed with the Edmonton Eskimos as a free agent on August 16, 2011, dressed for 11 games (starting 10 games) in the 2011 season, and was released by the Edmonton Eskimos on January 18, 2012.

On May 16, 2012, Patrick signed as a free agent with the Toronto Argonauts.  On June 10, 2012, the Toronto Argonauts traded Patrick to the Saskatchewan Roughriders for a 2014 conditional draft pick.

Patrick was released by the Saskatchewan Roughriders on August 16, 2012.

References

External links
San Francisco 49ers bio

1984 births
Living people
American football offensive guards
American football offensive tackles
Detroit Lions players
Edmonton Elks players
Green Bay Packers players
Kansas City Chiefs players
Nebraska Cornhuskers football players
New England Patriots players
New York Giants players
People from Ithaca, Michigan
Philadelphia Eagles players
Players of American football from Michigan
San Francisco 49ers players
Saskatchewan Roughriders players
Toronto Argonauts players
Virginia Destroyers players